HSEC may refer to:

 Health, Safety, Environment & Communities
 Historical Society of the Episcopal Church